Tomislav Šuker (born 26 April 1940 in Livno) is a Croatian retired track and field athlete who competed for Yugoslavia. He won a gold medal in shot put at the 1967 Mediterranean Games.

Tomislav Šuker also won the Yugoslavian championship in shot put twice, 1967 and 1968.

Tomislav Šuker is father of Davor Šuker, one of best Croatian footballers of all time.

References

Living people
1940 births
Croatian male shot putters
Yugoslav male shot putters
Mediterranean Games gold medalists for Yugoslavia
Athletes (track and field) at the 1967 Mediterranean Games
Mediterranean Games medalists in athletics

Croats of Bosnia and Herzegovina 
Sportspeople from Livno